Joseph-Henry Barbet de Jouy (16 July 1812, Canteleu – 26 May 1896, Paris) was a French archaeologist, art historian, and curator.

Biography 
His father was the industrialist, . From 1832 to 1840, he studied at both the Faculty of Law of Paris, and the architecture section of the École des Beaux-Arts. In 1850, he began working in the department of Medieval and Renaissance art at the Louvre. Following a trip to Italy in 1855, he was named Assistant Curator, then promoted to Curator in 1863, and his duties were expanded to include the collection in the associated Musée des Souverains.

At this time, he also wrote several major studies; notably Description des sculptures modernes (1856), Mosaiques chrétiennes des basiliques et églises de Rome (1857), and Fontes du primatice, dans le jardin de l'Empereur aux Tuilleries (1860), which earned him the title of Knight in the Legion of Honor.

From 1870 to 1871, he was given responsibility for the museum's security. In 1871, during Bloody Week, the Communards set fire to the Palais-Royal and the Tuilleries, placing the Louvre in danger. Sigoyer was killed the next day. An entrance to the museum has been named after Jouy. 

When peace had been restored, he was appointed Conservator for what is now known as the Réunion des Musées Nationaux (1871-1879) and, finally, Director of the Louvre (1879-1881). He was elected to the Académie des Beaux-Arts in 1880, where he took Seat #10 in the "Unattached" section.

References

Further reading
 Henri Bouchot, Notice sur M. Joseph-Henri Barbet de Jouy lue dans la séance du 26 juin 1897, Institut de France, Académie des beaux-arts, Paris, Firmin Didot, 1897
 Comte d’Ussel, "Barbet de Jouy, son journal pendant la Commune". In: Revue hebdomadaire, 1898, X, Plon, Nourrit et Compagnie, 1898
 Nicolas Chaudun, Le Brasier: Le Louvre incendié par la Commune, Actes SUD, 2015

External links 

 Biographical data from the Comité des travaux historiques et scientifiques @ La France Savante

1812 births
1896 deaths
French curators
French art historians
Recipients of the Legion of Honour
Members of the Académie des beaux-arts
Louvre
People from Seine-Maritime